Leo Charles Ferrari (December 8, 1927 – October 7, 2010) was a St. Thomas University philosophy professor, noted Saint Augustine scholar, and founding member of the parody organization Flat Earth Society of Canada.

Flat Earth Society activities 
Leo Ferrari was a founding member and head of the satirical Flat Earth Society of Canada, later renamed the Flat Earth Society (FES).

In Ferrari's writings in support of the FES and the Flat Earth, he attributed everything from gender to racial inequality on the globularist and the Spherical Earth model.  Ferrari even claimed to have nearly fallen off "the Edge" of the Earth at  Brimstone Head on Fogo Island.

Ferrari was a key figure in the 1990 flat earth "documentary", In Search of the Edge. In the accompanying study guide, Ferrari is outed as a "globularist," someone who believes the earth is spherical. The intent of the film was to promote critical thinking about media by "[attempting] to prove in convincing fashion, something everyone knew to be false."

Bibliography 
 
 

 Published Essays
 

 Human Rights Pamphlets
 The rise of human rights; a Canadian outline. Fredericton, New Brunswick: Human Rights Commission, Dept. of Labour, 1970. 
 Human rights and the Canadian Indian. Fredericton, New Brunswick: Human Rights Commission, Dept. of Labour, 1973. 
 Human rights in a changing world : the problem of preserving human values in the upheavals caused by science and technology. Fredericton, New Brunswick: Human Rights Commission, Dept. of Labour, 1977. 

 Poetry
 The worm's revenge. Fredericton, New Brunswick: Mortuary Press, 1968. 
 Over the Edge: Poems in Grateful Celebration of Fifty Years of Life, Love and of Laughter. Fredericton, New Brunswick: Owl and the Pussycat, 1977.

References

External links 
 Leo C. Ferrari fonds

1927 births
2010 deaths
Australian emigrants to Canada
People from Fredericton
Neurological disease deaths in New Brunswick
Deaths from Alzheimer's disease
Augustine scholars
Université Laval alumni